Liam McGrath is an Irish sportsperson.  He plays hurling and Gaelic football with his local club Loughmore-Castleiney and with the Tipperary senior inter-county team since 2014.

Career
McGrath captained Tipperary to win the 2011 All-Ireland Minor Football Championship.	
He was named in the Tipperary squad for the 2014 National Hurling League and made his league debut on 15 February against Waterford when he came on as a substitute.

Career statistics

Club

Hurling

Football

Inter-county

Hurling

Football

Honours
Loughmore-Castleiney
Tipperary Senior Hurling Championship (2): 2013, 2021
Tipperary Senior Football Championship (4): 2013, 2014, 2016, 2021
Mid Tipperary Senior Hurling Championship (3): 2011, 2016, 2018
Mid Tipperary Senior Football Championship (5): 2012, 2015, 2016 (c), 2017, 2018

Tipperary
All-Ireland Minor Football Championship (1): 2011
Munster Minor Football Championship (1): 2011
 National Football League Division 3 (1): 2017

References

External links
Tipperary GAA Player Profile

Tipperary inter-county hurlers
Dual players
Loughmore-Castleiney hurlers
Loughmore-Castleiney Gaelic footballers
Living people
1993 births